Gia Lâm is the easternmost rural district (huyện) of Hanoi, the capital city of Vietnam. Prior to 2003, the district covered the entire area of Long Biên district, which included Long Biên Bridge, Gia Lâm Airport, Gia Lâm railway station, Gia Lâm bus station and the headquarters of Vietnam Airlines.

Geography 
Gia Lâm district is bordered by Bắc Ninh province to the east and north, Đông Anh district to the northwest, Long Biên district and Hoàng Mai district to the west, Thanh Trì district and Hưng Yên province to the south. 

As of 2011, the district had a population of 243,957. The district capital lies at Trâu Quỳ township.

Gia Lâm district is subdivided to 22 commune-level subdivisions, including the townships of Trâu Quỳ (district capital), Yên Viên and the rural communes of: Bát Tràng, Cổ Bi, Đa Tốn, Đặng Xá, Đình Xuyên, Đông Dư, Dương Hà, Dương Quang, Dương Xá, Kiêu Kỵ, Kim Lan, Kim Sơn, Lệ Chi, Ninh Hiệp, Phù Đổng, Phú Thị, Trung Mầu, Văn Đức, Yên Thường, Yên Viên.

References

Districts of Hanoi